Ehingen may refer to the following places in Germany:

Ehingen, in the Alb-Donau district, Baden-Württemberg
Ehingen, Middle Franconia, in the district of Ansbach, Bavaria
Ehingen, Swabia, in the district of Augsburg, Bavaria
Ehingen am Ries, in the Donau-Ries district, Bavaria